Lectionary 331 (Gregory-Aland), designated by siglum ℓ 331 (in the Gregory-Aland numbering) is a Greek manuscript of the New Testament, on parchment. Palaeographically it has been assigned to the 13th-century. The manuscript has not survived in complete condition.

Description 

The original codex contained lessons from the Gospel of John (Evangelistarium), with lacunae on 118 parchment leaves. The leaves are measured.
It begins at John 17:20.

The text is written in Greek minuscule letters, in two columns per page, 25–29 lines per page.

The codex contains weekday Gospel lessons from Easter to Pentecost and Saturday/Sunday Gospel lessons for the other weeks.

History 

According to the colophon it was written in 1272.  It is presently assigned by the INTF to the 13th-century.

It was written by a monk named Cosmas for one Basilius.

It was purchased from Ivor B. Guest in 1871 (along with lectionary 330). It was examined and described by Oscar von Gebhardt in 1881.

The manuscript was added to the list of New Testament manuscripts by Scrivener (280e) and Gregory (number 331e). Gregory saw it in 1883.

Currently the codex is housed at the British Library (Add MS 28818) in London.

The fragment is not cited in critical editions of the Greek New Testament (UBS4, NA28).

See also 

 List of New Testament lectionaries
 Biblical manuscript
 Textual criticism
 Lectionary 330

Notes and references

Bibliography

External links 
 

Greek New Testament lectionaries
13th-century biblical manuscripts
British Library additional manuscripts